Hamadaea is a genus of bacteria from the family Micromonosporaceae. Hamadaea is named after the Japanese microbiologist Masa Hamada.

References 

Micromonosporaceae
Bacteria genera